The 2013–14 Colorado Buffaloes women's basketball team will represent University of Colorado Boulder during the 2013–14 NCAA Division I women's basketball season. The Buffaloes, led by fourth year head coach Linda Lappe, play their home games at the Coors Events Center and were a members of the Pac-12 Conference. They finished with a record of 19–15 overall, 6–12 in Pac-12 play for a tie for a ninth place finish. They lost in the quarterfinals of the 2014 Pac-12 Conference women's basketball tournament to Stanford. They were invited to the 2014 Women's National Invitation Tournament which they defeated TCU in the first round, Southern Utah in the second round before losing to UTEP in the third round.

Roster

Schedule

|-
!colspan=9 | Exhibition

|-
!colspan=9| Regular Season

|-
!colspan=9 | 2014 Pac-12 Conference women's tournament

|-
!colspan=9 | 2014 WNIT

Source

Rankings

See also
2013–14 Colorado Buffaloes men's basketball team

References

Colorado Buffaloes women's basketball seasons
Colorado
2014 Women's National Invitation Tournament participants
Colorado Buff
Colorado Buff